Starwin Products Ghana was a Ghanaian pharmaceutical manufacturer. It was the first pharmaceutical company to be listed on the Ghana Stock Exchange.  It was a component of the GSE All-Share Index. The company produced 8 brand name products.

History
Starwin began as the Ghana branch of Sterling Products International in 1960.  In 1976, under the Ghanaian government's indigenization program, the company sold 50% of its stock to entrepreneurs in Ghana.  In 1987, Sterling, the original company, was bought by Kodak and Starwin Products was born. On January 13, 2004 Starwin became a public limited liability company and in December 2004 the company was listed on the Ghana Stock Exchange.

In January 2020, Starwin Products Limited and two other domestic pharmaceutical companies, Dannex Limited and Ayrton Drug Manufacturing Limited, had already merged and listed on the Ghana Stock Exchange as DAS Pharma.

Operations
The company's product line included Rapinol, Asmadrin, Painoff, Paraking, milk of magnesia and liver salts.

References

External links
DAS Pharma official homepage
Starwin Products report from Gold Coast Securities - HTML version
SAS Ghana Brokerage Listings Page
Starwin Products at Alacrastore

Pharmaceutical companies of Ghana
Companies listed on the Ghana Stock Exchange
Pharmaceutical companies established in 1960
Manufacturing companies based in Accra
Ghanaian brands